is the twenty-fifth single by L'Arc-en-Ciel, released on June 2, 2004. Its B-side "Milky Way" is the first song that was performed by their alter ego, P'unk-en-Ciel. The single debuted at the number one position on the Oricon chart, and was certified Platinum by RIAJ for shipment of 250,000 copies.

Track listing

References

2004 singles
L'Arc-en-Ciel songs
Oricon Weekly number-one singles
Songs written by Hyde (musician)
Songs written by Tetsuya (musician)
Ki/oon Music singles
2004 songs